Mister Mummy is a 2022 Indian Hindi-language comedy drama film directed by Shaad Ali starring Riteish Deshmukh in the titular role and Genelia D'Souza. The story involves a man who becomes pregnant. The film received highly negative reviews.

Cast 
Riteish Deshmukh as Amol Khote
Genelia D'Souza as Gugloo Khote
Mahesh Manjrekar as Dr. Rampal Satsangi / Dr. Lakhanpal Satsangi (Double Role)

Production 
The film began production in March of 2022.

Controversy 
In 2019, Kolkata-based producer Akash Chatterjee told T-Series the story of Vicky Pet Se, which he wanted to star Ayushmann Khurrana. T-Series had agreed to co-produce the film. Mister Mummy has the same storyline as his script but Chatterjee argues that he did not get due credit. The poster of Mister Mummy is also similar to a poster of Vicky Pet Se.

Soundtrack

Reception 
A critic from The Times of India wrote that "All things considered, Mister Mummy could have explored a lot more with the material at hand. But Shaad Ali ends up losing out on this opportunity. Definitely not worth watching". A critic from Rediff.com wrote that "The film is neither a comedy ... nor an emotional drama of an estranged couple still in love". A critic from Koimoi wrote that "Mister Mummy cannot find a redemption because it doesn’t even try to find one". A critic from The Quint wrote that "Yet another mediocre Bollywood slapstick comedy that is nothing but repackaged queerphobia".

References

External links

2020s Hindi-language films
Indian pregnancy films
2022 films
Indian comedy films
2022 comedy films